The Male Lake is a freshwater body located in the western part of the Gouin Reservoir, in the territory of the town of La Tuque, in the administrative region of the Mauricie, in the province of Quebec, in Canada.

This lake extends mainly in the cantons of Lacasse (northern part of the lake), Toussaint (north-east), Hanotaux (west), Crémazie (center west), Lemay (center east), Poisson (South-West) and Evanturel (South-Central).

Recreotourism activities are the main economic activity of the sector. Forestry comes second. Recreational boating is particularly popular on this water, especially for sport fishing.

The hydrographic slope of the "Du Mâle Lake" is served on the side:
North, by the forest roads R2046 and R1045 which connects the village of Obedjiwan, Quebec;
West, by the forest road R1009, serving the Gouin Reservoir;
South, by the forest road R1009 and the R040.

The surface of Male Lake is usually frozen from mid-November to the end of April, however, safe ice circulation is generally from early December to late March. Water management at the Gouin Dam can lead to significant variations in the water level, particularly at the end of the winter when the water is lowered.

Geography

Toponymy
Formerly, this body of water was designated in the Innu language "Ayamba Sacahigan", as noted in 1871 by the surveyor John Bignell, meaning "lake to the male". In 1980, a survey carried out in Attikamek territory lists the name "Aiapew Sakahikan", which translates as "male moose lake". The form "Acohonan", meaning "lake where we can cross" is also known to Attikameks. Officially, until 1945, this body of water was designated "Grand lac du Mâle".

The southern part of "Du Mâle Lake" includes a bay designated "Petit lac du Mâle" (English: "Little Male Lake") which includes the "Sandbank". This bay is located on the north shore between Plamondon Bay (Gouin Reservoir) and Kaopatinak Pass. This toponymic designation dates from the early 1980s.

The toponym "Lac du Mâle" was formalized on December 18, 1986, by the Commission de toponymie du Québec.

Notes and references

See also 

Lakes of Mauricie
La Tuque, Quebec